Churchill's Island (French title: La Forteresse de Churchill) is a 1941 propaganda film chronicling the defence of Britain during the Second World War. The film was directed by Stuart Legg and produced by the National Film Board of Canada (NFB) for the Director of Information, Government of Canada.

Synopsis
Churchill's Island describes the military and civilian elements that were involved in the Battle of Britain. The Royal Air Force in an epic battle with the Luftwaffe, was able to wrest control of the skies, while the Royal Navy controlled the sea lanes around the embattled island. Other aspects of the struggle that are depicted included the British coastal defenses, the establishment of a mechanized cavalry, the role of merchant seamen and, after the Dunkirk evacuation, the re-building of a decimated British Army.

Production
Originally produced for the NFB's Canada Carries On series of documentary short films, it was released internationally in The World in Action series. Typical of the NFB's series, Churchill's Island relied heavily on newsreel footage. The British sequences were from the British Ministry of Information. The deep baritone voice of stage actor Lorne Greene (nicknamed "the Voice of Doom") was featured in the narration.

Reception

Churchill's Island was produced in 35 mm for the theatrical market. Each film in the series was shown over a six-month period as part of the shorts or newsreel segments in approximately 800 theatres across Canada. The NFB had an arrangement with Famous Players theatres to ensure that Canadians from coast to coast could see them, with further distribution by Columbia Pictures.

After the six-month theatrical tour ended, individual films were made available on 16 mm to schools, libraries, churches and factories, extending the life of these films for another year or two. They were also made available to film libraries operated by university and provincial authorities. A total of 199 films were produced before the series was canceled in 1959.

Honors
Churchill's Island received the first Oscar for Best Documentary Short Subject, awarded at the 14th Academy Awards ceremony in 1942. It also represents the first Oscar for the NFB, which had been created just two years earlier in 1939.

Preservation
The Academy Film Archive preserved Churchill's Island in 2005.

See also
List of Allied propaganda films of World War II

References

Notes

Bibliography

 Ellis, Jack C. John Grierson: Life, Contributions, Influence. Carbondale, Illinois: Southern Illinois University Press, 2000. .
 Ellis, Jack C. and Betsy A. McLane. New History of Documentary Film. London: Continuum International Publishing Group, 2005. .
 Khouri, Malek. Filming Politics: Communism and the Portrayal of the Working Class at the National Film Board of Canada, 1939-46. Calgary, Alberta, Canada: University of Calgary Press, 2007. .

External links

 
Canadian Film Encyclopedia

1941 films
1941 documentary films
Canadian aviation films
Battle of Britain films
Best Documentary Short Subject Academy Award winners
Canadian black-and-white films
Films directed by Stuart Legg
National Film Board of Canada documentaries
Canadian short documentary films
Films produced by Stuart Legg
Black-and-white documentary films
Films scored by Lucio Agostini
Canada Carries On
The World in Action
Quebec films
Columbia Pictures short films
1940s short documentary films
1940s English-language films
1940s Canadian films